Teki Pora, commonly known as Tekipora, is a village in Kupwara district of Jammu and Kashmir, India.

Demographics 
As of the 2011 Census of India, Teki Pora village has a total population of 7,437 people including 3,711 males and 3,726 females. The literacy rate of the Teki Pora village is 49.97%.

References 

Villages in Kupwara district